Elachista maritimella is a moth of the family Elachistidae first described by James Halliday McDunnough in 1942. It is found in Canada, where it has been recorded from New Brunswick, Newfoundland, Nova Scotia, Quebec, Saskatchewan and Alberta. The habitat consists of salt coastal meadows and vegetation bordering roads.

The wingspan is 9–10 mm. The forewings are variable in colouration, ranging from light yellow to patterned grey. There may be a white spot on the forewing costal region. The hindwings are grey.

References

maritimella
Moths described in 1942
Moths of North America